Chaparral is an unincorporated community and census-designated place (CDP) in Doña Ana and Otero counties, New Mexico. The population was 14,631 at the 2010 census. Chaparral is primarily a bedroom community for the neighboring city of El Paso, Texas, and the neighboring military installations of White Sands Missile Range and Fort Bliss. It is officially part of the Las Cruces Metropolitan Statistical Area.

Geography
Chaparral is located in the southeast corner of Doña Ana County and the southwest corner of Otero County at  (32.039072, −106.429630). Its southern border is the Texas state line, the northern limit of the city of El Paso. Chaparral is geographically isolated from the rest of Doña Ana County due to its location on the east side of the Franklin Mountains.

Demographics

As of the census of 2000, there were 6,117 people, 1,837 households, and 1,497 families residing in the CDP. The population density was 157.8 people per square mile (60.9/km2). There were 2,134 housing units at an average density of 55.1 per square mile (21.3/km2). The racial makeup of the CDP was 70.69% White, 1.26% African American, 1.29% Native American, 0.43% Asian, 0.18% Pacific Islander, 21.38% from other races, and 4.77% from two or more races. Hispanics or Latinos of any race were 64.49% of the population.

There were 1,837 households, out of which 48.9% had children under the age of 18 living with them, 62.6% were married couples living together, 14.1% had a female householder with no husband present, and 18.5% were non-families. 15.6% of all households were made up of individuals, and 5.2% had someone living alone who was 65 years of age or older. The average household size was 3.32 and the average family size was 3.70.

In the CDP, the population was spread out, with 36.2% under the age of 18, 9.1% from 18 to 24, 28.6% from 25 to 44, 18.9% from 45 to 64, and 7.1% who were 65 years of age or older. The median age was 29 years. For every 100 females, there were 101.1 males. For every 100 females aged 18 and over, there were 95.1 males.

The median income for a household in the CDP was $22,692, and the median income for a family was $26,153. Males had a median income of $23,904 versus $17,750 for females. The per capita income for the CDP was $10,033. About 25.2% of families and 31.3% of the population were below the poverty line, including 42.6% of those under age 18 and 24.8% of those age 65 or over.

Education
As part of the Gadsden Independent School District, Chaparral has the following public schools:

Elementary schools 
 Chaparral Elementary School
 Desert Trail Elementary School
 Sunrise Elementary School
 Yucca Heights Elementary school

Middle schools 
 Chaparral Middle School

High schools 
 Chaparral High School

Doña Ana Community College maintains a satellite campus in Chaparral.

Transportation
Commercial air and rail transportation are available in the neighboring city of El Paso, Texas. Several highways (state and federal) pass through Chaparral:
 NM 213, which runs north-south connecting El Paso to White Sands Missile Range. In Chaparral it is known as War Highway (which refers to its construction during World War II as a military access road) and connects to Martin Luther King Boulevard (Texas Farm-to-Market Road 3255) at the El Paso city limits.
 NM 404, which runs east-west. In both Anthony and Chaparral it is known as O'Hara Road.
 U.S. Route 54, which runs north-south along Chaparral's eastern border, connects to Dyer Street and the Patriot Freeway in El Paso.

Town highlights
 Chaparral High School
 Dolores Wright Park
 Chaparral Taekwondo Academy

Notable people

 Willie D. Madrid, member of the New Mexico House of Representatives
 Siddeeq Shabazz, professional football player

References

Census-designated places in Doña Ana County, New Mexico
Census-designated places in New Mexico